José Antonio "Pepe" Mostany (born 13 January 1963), is an Argentinian former rugby union player. He was the first Club Manuel Belgrano player to play for the Pumas.

Career
Mostany played for Club Manuel Belgrano in the Nacional de Clubes and had three caps in the 1987 Rugby World Cup, playing all the three pool stage matches, with the tournament being his only time where he played for the Argentine national team.

Notes

External links

1963 births
Living people
Argentine rugby union players
Rugby union flankers
Argentina international rugby union players